Port Comercial | La Factoria is a Barcelona Metro station located in the Zona Franca neighbourhood of the Barcelona municipality, served by line L10.

References

Barcelona Metro line 10 stations
Railway stations in Spain opened in 2021